The Avance is a river in Nouvelle-Aquitaine, France. It is a left tributary of the Garonne, into which it flows near Marmande.

References 

Rivers of France
Rivers of Nouvelle-Aquitaine
Rivers of Lot-et-Garonne